Jaakko Rissanen (born November 12, 1989) is a Finnish professional ice hockey player who currently plays for Linköpings HC in the Swedish Hockey League (SHL).

Playing career
He previously played for KalPa and SaiPa in the Finnish Liiga. Following the 2016–17 season, his 8th in Finland, Rissanen left as a free agent seeking a new challenge in agreeing to a two-year contract with Russian club, HC Vityaz of the KHL on May 3, 2017.

In the 2017–18 season, Rissanen made his debut with Vityaz, and appeared in 21 games for 8 points before he was traded to Kunlun Red Star in exchange for fellow Finnish forward Matias Myttynen on November 6, 2017.

On June 3, 2019, Rissanen again left KalPa for the third time following the 2018–19 season, agreeing to a one-year contract with Swedish outfit, Linköpings HC of the SHL.

References

External links

1989 births
Living people
Finnish ice hockey forwards
KalPa players
HC Kunlun Red Star players
SaiPa players
HC Vityaz players
People from Kuopio
Sportspeople from North Savo